Agboola is both a surname and a given name of Yoruba origin. Notable people with the name include:

Reuben Agboola (born 1962), Nigerian footballer
Agboola Shadare, Nigerian songwriter
Ibrahim Agboola Gambari, Nigerian politician

Yoruba-language surnames
Yoruba given names
Feminine given names